Kopecký (feminine Kopecká) is a Czech and Slovak surname. It may refer to:

 Arno Kopecky, Canadian journalist and travel writer
 Ivan Kopecký (born 1946), Czech football manager
 Jan Kopecký (born 1982), Czech rally driver
 Jaromír Kopecký (1921–unknown), Czech diplomat
 Josef Kopecký (1892–unknown), Czech sport shooter
 Lotte Kopecky (born 1995), Belgian racing cyclist
 Marek Kopecký (born 1977), Czech futsal player
 Matej Kopecký (born 1990), Slovak footballer
 Matěj Kopecký (1775–1847), Czech puppeteer
 Milan Kopecký (born 1981), Czech ice hockey player
 Miloš Kopecký (1922–1996), Czech actor
 Peter Kopecký, Slovak politician
 Radim Kopecký (born 1985), Czech footballer
 Štěpán Kopecký (1901–1956), Czech art director
 Tomáš Kopecký (born 1982), Slovak ice hockey player
 Václav Kopecký (1897–1961), Czech politician
 Vlastimil Kopecký (1912–1967), Czech footballer
 William Kopecky (born 1969), American musician

See also
 
 

Czech-language surnames
Slovak-language surnames